Amalda sibuetae is a species of sea snail, a marine gastropod mollusc in the family Ancillariidae, the olives.

Description

Distribution
This species is distributed in the Northwest Atlantic Ocean.

References

 Kantor Y. & Bouchet P. (1999). A deep-sea Amalda (Gastropoda: Olividae) in the north-eastern Atlantic. Journal of Conchology 36 (5) Page 11–16.

External links
 Specimen at MNHN, Paris

sibuetae
Gastropods described in 1999